Susan Hopkins CBE is an Irish epidemiologist and civil servant working in the UK. She is honorary clinical senior lecturer in the Department of Medicine at Imperial College London, and Chief Medical Advisor for the UK Health Security Agency (UKHSA).

Career
Hopkins trained in infectious diseases, microbiology and epidemiology in Ireland, France and the UK. In 2006 she was appointed a consultant in infectious diseases and microbiology at the Royal Free Hospital. She became Clinical Director of Infection Services at the Royal Free London NHS Foundation Trust, and Deputy Director of the National Infection Service at Public Health England.

In 2018 she was called as a witness by the Health and Social Care Committee on antimicrobial resistance.

In January 2020 Hopkins was appointed Incident Director within Public Health England's COVID-19 incident response. In August 2021 she was appointed Interim Chief Medical Advisor at NHS Test and Trace and the Strategic Response Director for COVID-19 at Public Health England.

In November 2021 Hopkins raised concerns about the new B.1.1.529 variant, later named the omicron variant, of Covid-19. In December 2021 she warned that further restrictions may be needed to tackle an "inevitable" and "big wave of infections".

Awards
In December 2021 Hopkins was awarded the Presidential Distinguished Service Award by Michael D. Higgins. 

In May 2022, she was awarded as Honorary Commander of the Order of the British Empire (CBE), for services to Public Health.

References

Year of birth missing (living people)
Living people
Irish epidemiologists
21st-century Irish medical doctors
Irish women medical doctors
Physicians of the Royal Free Hospital
Academics of Imperial College London
Public Health England
Honorary Commanders of the Order of the British Empire
Women epidemiologists